Stepnoye Ozero is an urban locality (an urban-type settlement) in Blagoveshchensky District of Altai Krai, Russia. Population:

References

Urban-type settlements in Altai Krai